Budi Gunadi Sadikin (born May 6, 1964) is an Indonesian politician.  he serves as Minister of Health in the Onward Indonesia Cabinet of President Joko Widodo. He is only the second Health Minister not to graduate from a medical school, and the first since Mananti Sitompul.

He previously served as President Director at Bank Mandiri.

During the COVID-19 pandemic, his office set up a special unit to deal with flagging oxygen supplies for medical use.

References 

Living people
Place of birth missing (living people)
Health ministers of Indonesia
Onward Indonesia Cabinet
1964 births
21st-century Indonesian politicians